Orotukan is an urban locality (an urban-type settlement) in Yagodninsky District of Magadan Oblast, Russia, located in the Kolyma region about  north of Magadan, on the right bank of the Orotukan River (a tributary of the Kolyma). Its population has declined since the fall of the Soviet Union:

History
In 1931, as geologists found gold reserves in the valleys of the Kolyma region, they built a camp on the river close to present location of Orotukan. Shortly thereafter the construction of the Kolyma Highway (also known as the Road of Bones) began.

The settlement was founded on its present site in the mid-1930s. It received its name from the river, whose name came from the Yakut word өртөөһүн (örtööhün) meaning small burnt meadow or forest area.  From 1935, a camp in the regional section of the gulag system operated by Dalstroy was located here.

In the 1940s, a repair work and factory for mining equipment were established. Orotukan was granted urban-type settlement status in 1953.

Economy
During the Soviet era, the settlement was a center for gold mining and exploration.

Transportation
The settlement lies on the M56 Kolyma Highway, which runs from Magadan through Susuman in the northwestern part of Magadan Oblast and onto Yakutsk, although the road is only completely passable during winter when the rivers en route are frozen.

Climate
Orotukan has a severe subarctic climate (Dfc).

Notable people
Tina Karol (b. 1985), pop singer
Matvey Korobov (b. 1983), boxer

References

Urban-type settlements in Magadan Oblast